Brindleyplace tram stop is a tram stop on Line 1 of the West Midlands Metro located in Brindleyplace, Birmingham. It opened on 17 July 2022 as when the line was extended from Library to Edgbaston.

References

Railway stations in Great Britain opened in 2022
West Midlands Metro stops